Khaneh Hay Khodadad Atash Behar (also Romanized as Khāneh Hāy Khodādād Ātash Behār) is a village in Kambel-e Soleyman Rural District, in the Central District of Chabahar County, Sistan and Baluchestan Province, Iran. At the 2006 census, its population was 144, in 29 families.

References 

Populated places in Chabahar County